Misje is an island (and village) in Øygarden Municipality in Vestland county, Norway. The  island lies just south of the island of Toftøyna and north of the large island of Sotra.  Almost all of the 257 inhabitants (as of 2009) live on the eastern part of the island, which is referred to as the village of Misje.

Historically, the island was part of the old municipality of Herdla. In 1964, it was transferred to the newly established municipality of Fjell (and then part of Øygarden since 2020). The island has been connected to the neighboring island of Sotra by the Solviksundet Bridge since 1982. Sotra, in turn, is connected to the mainland by a series of bridges.

See also
List of islands of Norway

References

Islands of Vestland
Villages in Vestland
Øygarden